A coa de jima or coa ("hoe for harvesting", "hoe") is a specialized tool for harvesting agaves. 

It is a long, machete-like round-ended knife on a long wooden handle used by a jimador to cut the leaves off an agave being harvested and to cut the agave from its roots. The core (or "heart") left, called piña ("pineapple"), is used for the production of mezcal, sotol or tequila. 

The shape of the coa is adapted for the efficiency of carrying out these operations.

References 
 

Machetes
Gardening tools